Nunungan, officially the Municipality of Nunungan (Maranao: Inged a Nunungan;), is a 3rd class municipality in the province of Lanao del Norte, Philippines. According to the 2020 census, it has a population of 18,827 people.

Geography
Nunungan or Nonongen (Anonongun same Ladugun in M'ranaw version) is the largest municipality in Lanao del Norte in terms of land area. It is home (Native Place of Iranon) to the Mount Inayawan Range Natural Park (Palaw a Piyagayongan, Inayongan).

Barangays

Nunungan is politically subdivided into 25 barangays.

Climate

Demographics

Economy

Government
Mayors after People Power Revolution 1986:

Vice Mayors after People Power Revolution 1986:

References

External links

 Nunungan Profile at the DTI Cities and Municipalities Competitive Index
 [ Philippine Standard Geographic Code]
Philippine Census Information
Local Governance Performance Management System

Municipalities of Lanao del Norte